The 2015 São Paulo World Challenge Cup was a gymnastics competition held in the southeastern city of São Paulo, one of the largest cities in Brazil. It was held in the Geraldo José de Almeida Gym from May 1 to May 3, 2015.

Schedule  
Tuesday, 28 April 2015
 Arrival of the Delegations
 14:30 – 19:30 Official training
Wednesday, 29 April 2015
 9:00 – 11:30 Official training 
 14:30 – 19:30 Official training
Thursday, 30 April 2015
  9:00 – 11:30 Official training
 14:30 – 19:30 Official training
 21:00 – Technical Meeting (Bourbon Ibirapuera Hotel)
Friday, 1 May 2015
 9:00 – 11:30 Official training
 13:00 – Judges’ instruction (Bourbon Ibirapuera Hotel) 
 14:00 – 15:55 Warm-up
 16:00 – 20:00 Qualifications I MAG & WAG
Saturday, 2 May 2015
 8:00 – Judges’ instruction (Bourbon Ibirapuera Hotel) 
 8:30 – 9:55 Warm-up
 12:00 – Qualifications II MAG & WAG 
 15:55 – Warm-up
 18:00 – Final I MAG & WAG (5 apparatus)
Sunday, 3 May 2015
 8:00 – Judges’ instruction (Bourbon Ibirapuera Hotel)
 8:30 – 9:55 Warm-up
 10:00 – 12:00 Final II MAG & WAG (5 apparatus)
 Final banquet
Monday, 4 May 2015
 Departure of Delegations

Medal winners

Qualification results

Men's results

Women's results

Final's results

Women's results

Vault

Uneven Bars

Balance Beam

Floor Exercise

References

2015 in gymnastics
2015 in Brazilian sport
International sports competitions in São Paulo
International gymnastics competitions hosted by Brazil